John James McAleese (August 22, 1878 – November 15, 1950) was a Major League Baseball player. He pitched three innings, giving up seven hits and three runs. He did not return to the majors until , when he served as the primary reserve outfielder for the St. Louis Browns. After batting just .213 in 85 games, he returned to the minors for a few years, retiring after the 1912 season.

External links

Major League Baseball outfielders
Chicago White Sox players
St. Louis Browns players
Youngstown Puddlers players
Newark Sailors players
Rochester Bronchos players
Binghamton Bingoes players
Harrisburg Senators players
Johnstown Johnnies players
Youngstown Champs players
Denver Grizzlies (baseball) players
Youngstown Steelmen players
Baseball players from Pennsylvania
1878 births
1950 deaths
Concord Marines players